Durgapuri is an elevated metro station located on the Red Line of Lucknow Metro in the city of Lucknow Uttar Pradesh.

History

Structure

Station layout

Connections

Lucknow Junction railway station

Lucknow City Transport Services Ltd  bus routes number 11, 11A, 11D, 11E, 11G, 12, 13, 15, 23, 23A, 23B, 23T, 24A, 24B, 25, 25A, 31, 31A, 33, 33B, 33C, 33M, 33PGI, 33S, 33SAKHI, 34, 34IT, 35A, 35I, 35LU, 44B, 44D, 45, 65T, 65V, 66, 66A, 66LU, 68, 69  serves the station from nearby Charbagh bus stand.

Entry/Exit

See also

References

External links

website

 UrbanRail.Net – descriptions of all metro systems in the world, each with a schematic map showing all stations.

Lucknow Metro stations
Railway stations in India opened in 2017